Monroe Township is one of the twelve townships of Preble County, Ohio, United States.  The 2000 census found 2,290 people in the township, 1,314 of whom lived in the unincorporated portions of the township. The Monroe community is served by National Trail High School and the National Trail Local School District. Interstate 70 runs along the southern part of the township and has a major interchange at U.S. Route 127.

Geography
Located in the northern part of the county, it borders the following townships:
Butler Township, Darke County - north
Twin Township, Darke County - northeast corner
Harrison Township - east
Twin Township - southeast corner
Washington Township - south
Jackson Township - southwest corner
Jefferson Township - west
Harrison Township, Darke County - northwest corner

Two incorporated villages are located in Monroe Township: Eldorado in the northwest, and West Manchester in the northeast. Two major U.S highways intersect within the township. U.S. Route 40 runs east and west, while U.S. Route 127 runs north and south.

Name and history
Monroe Township was established in 1817. It is one of twenty-two Monroe Townships statewide.

Government
The township is governed by a three-member board of trustees, who are elected in November of odd-numbered years to a four-year term beginning on the following January 1. Two are elected in the year after the presidential election and one is elected in the year before it. There is also an elected township fiscal officer, who serves a four-year term beginning on April 1 of the year after the election, which is held in November of the year before the presidential election. Vacancies in the fiscal officership or on the board of trustees are filled by the remaining trustees.

References

External links
County website

Townships in Preble County, Ohio
Townships in Ohio